James Victor Uspensky (April 29, 1883 – January 27, 1947) was a Russian and American mathematician notable for writing Theory of Equations.

Biography
Uspensky graduated from the University of St. Petersburg in 1906 and received his doctorate from the University of St. Petersburg in 1910. He was a member of the Russian Academy of Sciences from 1921.

Uspensky joined the faculty of Stanford University in 1929-30 and 1930-31 as acting professor of mathematics. He was professor of mathematics at Stanford from 1931 until his death. Uspensky was the one who kept alive Vincent's theorem of 1834 and 1836, carrying the torch (so to speak) from Serret.

Books

Notes

References
 
 
 Halsey Royden (1988). The History of the Mathematics Department at Stanford, in A Century of Mathematics in America edited by Peter L. Duren, Richard Askey, and Uta C. Merzbach. American Mathematical Society, History of Mathematics Volume 2, Providence, Rhode Island. Link to PDF: "A History of Mathematics at Stanford" by Halsey Royden.

External links
 

1883 births
1947 deaths
20th-century Russian mathematicians
Stanford University Department of Mathematics faculty
Full Members of the Russian Academy of Sciences (1917–1925)
Full Members of the USSR Academy of Sciences
Soviet mathematicians
American mathematicians